DX-peditions are planned events for amateur radio operators who are working to obtain awards for contacting several areas or countries. These excursions offer radio operators around the world a chance to make contacts with locations that are difficult to access.

Notes

References 

Amateur radio
DXpeditions